James McEntee may refer to:

 James McEntee (Gaelic footballer), Irish Gaelic footballer who plays for Meath
 James McEntee (labor leader) (1884–1957), American machinist and labor leader

See also
 James McEntee Academy, an elementary school